In mathematics, Vinogradov's mean value theorem is an estimate for the number of equal sums of powers.
It is an important inequality in analytic number theory, named for I. M. Vinogradov.

More specifically, let  count the number of solutions to the system of  simultaneous Diophantine equations in  variables given by

with
.
That is, it counts the number of equal sums of powers with equal numbers of terms and equal exponents,

where

An analysis of the proofs of the Vinogradov mean-value conjecture can be found in the Bourbaki Séminaire talk by Lillian Pierce.

Lower bounds
By considering the  solutions where

one can see that .

A more careful analysis (see Vaughan  equation 7.4) provides the lower bound

Proof of the Main conjecture
The main conjecture of Vinogradov's mean value theorem was that the upper bound is close to this lower bound. More specifically that for any  we have

This was proved by Jean Bourgain, Ciprian Demeter, and Larry Guth and by a different method by Trevor Wooley.

If

this is equivalent to the bound

Similarly if  the conjectural form is equivalent to the bound

History 
Vinogradov's original theorem of 1935  showed that for fixed   with

there exists a positive constant  such that

Although this was a ground-breaking result, it falls short of the full conjectured form. Instead it demonstrates the conjectured form when

.

Vinogradov's approach was improved upon by Karatsuba and Stechkin who showed that for  there exists a positive constant  such that

where

Noting that for

we have

,

The method can be sharpened further to prove the asymptotic estimate

He proved that for

 and 

and for any  we have

Specifically they show that for

and

for any 

we have

References 

Theorems in analytic number theory